Jonathan Eybeschutz (רבי יהונתן אייבשיץ)  (also Eibeschutz or Eibeschitz; 1690 1764) was a Talmudist, Halachist, Kabbalist, holding positions as Dayan of Prague, and later as Rabbi of the "Three Communities": Altona, Hamburg and Wandsbek. With Jacob Emden, he is well known as a protagonist in the Emden–Eybeschutz Controversy.

Biography
Eybeschutz's father Nosson Nota was the rabbi in Ivančice (sometimes Eibeschutz), Habsburg Moravia. Born in Kraków, Eybeschutz was a child prodigy in Talmud; on his father's death, he studied in the yeshiva of Meir Eisenstadt in Prostějov (Prossnitz), and then later in Holešov (Holleschau). He also lived in Vienna for a short time. He married Elkele Spira, daughter of Rabbi Isaac Spira, and they lived in Hamburg for two years with Mordecai ha-Kohen, Elkele's maternal grandfather.

At the age of eighteen, Eybeschutz was appointed rabbi of Bolesławiec, where he stayed for three years, afterward settling in Prague in 1700 and becoming head of the yeshivah and a famous preacher. The people of Prague held Eybeschutz in high esteem and he was considered second there only to Chief Rabbi David Oppenheim.

In Prague, Eybeschutz received permission to print the Talmud—but with the omission of all passages contradicting the principles of Christianity in consultation with Chief Rabbi David Oppenheim. Legends and rumors seeking to discredit the event said that he did this without the consultation of the Rabbis of Prague, and they revoked the printing license.

In 1724, in Prague 1724 he was suspected of being a Sabbatean. Despite denouncing the Sabbatean movement on Yom Kippur the accusations continued. Therefore, In 1736, Eybeschutz was only appointed dayan of Prague and not chief rabbi. He became rabbi of Metz in 1741, and in 1750,  was elected rabbi of the "Three Communities:" Altona, Hamburg, and Wandsbek.

In July 1725, the Ashkenazic beit din of Amsterdam issued a ban of excommunication on the entire Sabbatian sect (kat ha-ma’aminim). Writings of Sabbatian nature found by the beit Din at that time were attributed to Eybeschutz  In early September, similar excommunication proclamations were issued by the batei din of Frankfurt and the triple community of Altona, Hamburg, and Wandsbeck. The three bans were printed and circulated in other Jewish communities throughout Europe. Rabbi Ezekiel Katzenellenbogen, the chief rabbi of the Triple Community  was unwilling to attack Eybeschutz publicly, mentioning that ‘greater than him have fallen and crumbled’ and that ‘there is nothing we can do to him’  However, Rabbi Katzenelenbogen stated that one of the texts found by the Amsterdam beit din "Va-Avo ha-Yom el ha-Ayyin”  was authored by Jonathan Eybeschutz and declared that the all copies of the work that were in circulation should be immediately burned. As a result of Eybeschutz and other rabbis in Prague formulating a new (and different) ban against Sabbatianism shortly after the other bans were published, his reputation was restored and Eybeschutz was regarded as having been totally vindicated. The issue was to arise again, albeit tangentially, in the 1751 dispute between Emden and Eybeschutz.

He was "an acknowledged genius" in at least three separate areas of Jewish religious creativity: Talmud and Jewish law (halakhah); homiletics (derush) and popular preaching; and Kabbalah. "He was a man of erudition, but he owed his fame chiefly to his personality. Few men of the period so profoundly impressed their mark on Jewish life." His granddaughter was the Breslau poet and intellectual , born Esther Gad.

Sabbatian controversy
Eybeschutz was again accused of secret Sabbatean beliefs following a suspicion that he had issued amulets recognising the Messianic claims of Sabbatai Zevi. The controversy started when Yaakov Emden found connections between the Kabbalistic and homiletic writings of Eybeschutz with those of the Sabbatean Judah Leib Prossnitz, whom Eybeschutz knew from his days in Prossnitz. Rabbi Jacob Emden accused him of heresy. The majority of the rabbis in Poland, Moravia, and Bohemia, as well as the leaders of the Three Communities supported Eybeschutz: the accusation was "utterly incredible"—in 1725, Eybeschutz was among the Prague rabbis who excommunicated the Sabbateans. Others suggest that the Rabbis issued this ruling because they feared the repercussions if their leading figure, Eybeschutz, was found to be a Sabbatean. Jacob Emden suggests that the rabbis  decided against attacking Eybeschutz out of a reluctance to offend his powerful family and a fear of rich supporters of his living in their communities   The recent discovery of notarial copies of the actual amulets found in Metz and copying the amulets written by Eybeschutz support Emden's view that these are Sabbatean writings.

In 1752, the controversy between Emden and Eybeschutz raged. Clashes between opposing supporters occurred in the streets drawing the attention of the secular authorities. Emden fled. The controversy was heard by both the Senate of Hamburg and by the Royal Court of Denmark. The Hamburg Senate quickly found in favour of Eybeschutz. The King of Denmark asked Eybeschutz to answer a number of questions about the amulets. Conflicting testimony was put forward and the matter remained officially unresolved although the court imposed fines on both parties for civil unrest and ordered that Emden be allowed to return to Altona.  At this point Eybeschutz was defended by Carl Anton, a convert to Christianity, but a former disciple of Eybeschutz. Emden refused to accept the outcome and sent out vicious pamphlets attacking Eybeschutz. Eybeschutz was re-elected as Chief Rabbi. In December of that year, the Hamburg Senate rejected both the King's decision and the election result. The Senate of Hamburg started an intricate process to determine the powers of Eybeschutz, and many members of that congregation demanded that he should submit his case to rabbinical authorities.

The controversy was a momentous incident in Jewish history of the period—involving both Yechezkel Landau and the Vilna Gaon. Eybeschutz approached the young Gaon to examine and appraise the amulets. The Gaon replied in a letter that while he had sympathy with Eybeschutz he did not believe that the words of a young man would assist in the dispute. Some time after the dispute Landau, who at that time was a relatively unknown rabbi from Yampol, attempted to resolve the dispute offering both parties a dignified exit. His proposal  was accepted by Eybeschutz but vehemently rejected by Emden, who continued to publish attacks on Eybeschutz.  Only after Emden's death did the halachic decision of Landau bring an end to the personal dispute. Some believe that he may be credited with having crushed the lingering belief in Sabbatai current even in some Orthodox circles. However, it is only recently that the notarised copies of all of the amulets have been rediscovered, clearly Sabbatean in nature. and the debate of 1725 has been located in the archives.

In 1760, the quarrel broke out once more when some Sabbatean elements were discovered among the students of Eybeschutz' yeshivah.
At the same time his younger son, Wolf Jonas Eybeschutz, presented himself as a Sabbatean prophet, and was close to several Frankists, with the result that the yeshivah was closed.

Jonathan Eybeschutz's grandson was rumored to be Baron Thomas von Schoenfeld, an apostate Jew who inherited his grandfather's collection of Sabbatean kabbalistic works. He eventually left the Sabbatean movement and founded a Masonic lodge called the Asiatische Bruder, one of four Illuminati lodges in Vienna. After his uncle's death on August 10, 1791, he was offered the leadership of the Frankist movement which he refused. Katz disputes this claim however, saying that Baron Thomas von Schoenfeld was a member of the Dobruschka family of Brno and was in no way related, either by blood or marriage, to Eybeschutz. According to Gershom Scholem, the ideology of the Asiatic Brethren mixed Kabbalistic and Sabbatean ideas jumbled together with Christian theosophic doctrines.

Some of Eybeschutz's descendants are the Yiddish novelist and Holocaust survivor Chava Rosenfarb (1923–2011), Chaim Kreiswirth (1918-2001) of Antwerp, Belgium, and Shmuel Wosner (1913–2015), a prominent Haredi rabbi and posek ('decisor of Jewish law') who lived in Bnei Brak, Israel.

Works
Thirty of his works in the area of Halakha (Jewish law) have been published. In addition, several of his works on homiletics, teaching methodology, and Kabbalah are currently in print.  Only one of his works was published in his lifetime. The posthumous printing of so many of his works is testimony to his influence on his contemporaries through his oral teachings and his personality.

Homiletics (derush) and popular preaching::
Ya'arot Devash a frequently quoted collection of the sermons of Eybeschutz.
Tiferet Yehonatan on the weekly Torah portion
Midrash Yehonatan on the weekly Torah portion
Ahavat Yehonatan on the weekly Haftarah 
Shirei Mitzvot, the 613 commandments in rhymed acrostics.
 Notes on the Passover Haggadah, as well as Perush al Piska Had Gadya on the poem Had Gadya
On Talmud and halakhah::
Chasdei Yehonatan, Pilpulim on assorted Sugyas of Talmud and halakhah.
 Novellae to Shulchan Aruch: Urim ve-Tummim on Choshen Mishpat; Kereti u-Peleti on Yoreh De'ah; Sar ha-Alef on Orach Chayim.
 Notes on Maimonides' Mishneh Torah: Binah la-Ittim and Chiddushim al Hilkot Yom Tov both dealing with the holy days, and both published by his students, based on notes taken from his lectures; Bene Ahuvah on the matrimonial laws.
Tiferet Yisrael, notes on the rabbinical laws of niddah (regarding menstruation), with additions by the editor, his grandson Israel.
Matuk MidVash, notes on the rabbinical laws of shabbos.
On Kabbalah::
Shem Olam, a collection of letters on the Kabbalah

Eybeschutz also wrote Luchoth Edut (Tablets of Testimony), in which he describes the whole dispute and attempts to refute the charges against him. It includes also the letters of recommendation which he had received from leading rabbis who came to his defense. In January 2014, Maggid Books, a division of Koren Publishers Jerusalem published "Derash Yehonatan: Around the Year with Yehonatan Eybeshitz" by Rabbi Shalom Hammer. This work is one of the first English translations of Eybeshütz's writings.

References

Sources
 Moshe Perlmutter, R.Yehonatan Aibeshits ve-yahaso el ha-Shabtaut : hakirot hadashot 'al yesod ketav ha-yad shel s.va-avo ha-yom el ha-'ayin (Tel Aviv:1947 )
 Carl Anton, Period documents concerning the Emden/Eibeschuetz controversy. (Reprint 1992)
 Elisheva Carlebach, The pursuit of heresy : Rabbi Moses Hagiz and the Sabbatian controversies (Columbia 1990)
 Gershom Scholem, Meḥḳere Shabtaʼut (1991)
 Sid Leiman/Simon Schwarzfuchs, New Evidence on the Emden-Eibeschiitz Controversy. The Amulets from Metz, Revue des Etudes Juives 165 (2006),
 Sid Z. Leiman, "When a Rabbi Is Accused of Heresy: R. Ezekiel Landau's Attitude toward R. Jonathan Eibeschuetz in the Emden- Eibeschuetz Controversy in FROM ANCIENT ISRAEL TO MODERN JUDAISM Edited by Jacob Neusner
 Leiman, Sid (Shnayer) Z. When a rabbi is accused of heresy : the stance of the Gaon of Vilna in the Emden-Eibeschuetz controversy in Me'ah She'arim (2001) 251-263
 Leiman, Sid (Shnayer) Z. When a rabbi is accused of heresy : the stance of Jacob Joshua Falk in the Emden-Eibeschuetz controversy. Rabbinic Culture and Its Critics (2008) 435-456
 Moshe Carmilly-Weinberger, Wolf Jonas Eybeschutz - an "Enlightened" Sabbatean in Transylvania Studia Judaica, 6 (1997) 7-26
 Yehuda Liebes "A Messianic Treatise by  R. Wolf  the son of  R. Jonathan Eibeschutz." Qiryat Sefer 57 (1982/2)148-178.

External links

Eybeschutz, Jonathan, jewishencyclopedia.com
Jonathan Eybeschutz, chabad.org
Jonathan Eibeschutz, jewishvirtuallibrary.org
detailed Hebrew article by Hayyim Rabinovitz in Sinai 1964

18th-century Bohemian rabbis
18th-century German rabbis
German Orthodox rabbis
Czech Orthodox rabbis
Polish Orthodox rabbis
Kabbalists
Czech expatriates in Poland
Rabbis from Kraków
Rabbis from Prague
1690 births
1764 deaths